Cotoletta (from costoletta meaning "little rib", because of the rib that remains attached to the meat during and after cooking) is an Italian word for a veal breaded cutlet. There are several variations, in Italy as well as in other countries, due to Italian diaspora.

Italy

Lombardy

Cotoletta alla milanese ( after its place of origin, Milan) is a fried veal breaded cutlet similar to Wiener Schnitzel, but cooked with the bone-in. It is traditionally fried in clarified butter. Due to its shape, it is often called oreggia d'elefant in Milanese or orecchia d'elefante in Italian, meaning elephant's ear.

Emilia-Romagna
Cotoletta alla bolognese ( after its place of origin, Bologna) is similar to a milanese but melted Parmesan cheese and pieces of prosciutto are put overtop of the fried veal cutlet.

Sicily
Cotoletta alla palermitana ( after its place of origin, Palermo) is similar to a milanese but the veal is brushed with olive oil, and then baked or grilled instead of being fried. The breadcrumb is often mixed with parsley and pecorino cheese, and unlike the Milanese cutlet, the Palermitana cutlet does not have eggs in its breading.

Argentina

Various breaded meat dishes prepared in Argentina were inspired by the cotoletta alla milanese and are known as milanesa. In Argentina and Uruguay, Milanesa a la napolitana is made similar to the cotoletta with a preparation of cheese and tomato.

United States
Veal parmigiana is an Italian-American hybrid of cotoletta and the traditional Italian dish parmigiana di melanzane, consisting of a fried veal cutlet but prepared in a similar way to parmigiana di melanzane, substituting the eggplant for veal.

See also

List of Italian dishes
List of veal dishes

References

Breaded cutlets
Italian cuisine
Veal dishes